was a Japanese samurai best known for his haibun, a scholar of Kokugaku, and haikai poet. He was born , and took the pseudonym Tatsunojō. His family are believed to be descendants of Hōjō Tokiyuki.

Life 
Yayū was born in Nagoya, the first son of  who served the Owari Domain. He inherited the Yokoi House's patrimony at twenty-six and held important posts of the Owari Domain. He was for example yōnin (manager of general affairs), Ōbangashira (chief of guard) and Jisha-Bugyō (manager of  religious affairs). In 1754, at age 53, he retired for health reasons. He was a prolific and respected composer of haibun, Classical Chinese poems, waka and Japanese satirical poems, and was an adept of the Japanese tea ceremony.

Works 
Yayū also excelled in Japanese martial arts, studied Confucianism and learned haikai from Mutō Hajaku (武藤巴雀) and Ōta Hajō (太田巴静). Hajaku and Hajō were pupils of Kagami Shikō (各務支考), a leading disciple of Matsuo Bashō. Mori Senzō (森銑三), a student of old Japanese literature, compared his hokku to senryū, and said they were not as interesting as his haibun. Yayū has been described as a master of haibun, and Nagai Kafū 永井荷風　called Yayū's haibun a model of Japanese prose.

 "Uzuragoromo" (鶉衣)　: An anthology of haibun, partially translated in Monumenta Nipponica, vol. 34, no. 3, Autumn 1979, by Lawrence Rogers.
 "Rayō Shū", "Tetsu Shū" (蘿葉集), (垤集): Anthology of haiku.
 "More Oke" (漏桶): Anthology of renku
 "Kankensō" (管見草): Essay on haikai
 "Rain Hen" (蘿隠編): Prose and poetry in Classical Chinese
 "Gyō-Gyō-Shi" (行々子):　An anthology of Japanese satirical poems

See also 
Haibun
Haiku

References 
 "Zoku Kinsei Kijinden" (続近世畸人伝) by Ban Kōkei (伴蒿蹊) (in Japanese)
 "Haika Kijin-Dan" (俳家奇人談) by Takenouchi Gengen-ichi (竹内玄玄一) (in Japanese)

Kokugaku scholars
Japanese essayists
Japanese Confucianists
1702 births
1783 deaths
Japanese writers of the Edo period
18th-century Japanese poets
Japanese Buddhists
Japanese haiku poets